The Miss Perú 1959 pageant was held on July 15, 1959. That year, 33 candidates from different districts, cities and regions of Peru were enroll, Sixteen candidates survived the first cut and competed for the two national crowns, culminating in the final night. The chosen winners represented Peru at the Miss Universe 1959 and, for the first time, at Miss World 1959. The rest of the finalists would enter different pageants.

Placements

Special Awards

 Miss Photogenic - Piura - María Elena Rossel
 Miss Congeniality - San Martín - Mery Checa
 Miss Elegance - Distrito Capital - Monona Velarde

.

Delegates

Amazonas - Amelia 'Melita' Castro
Arequipa - Rosario García
Callao - Guadalupe Mariátegui
Distrito Capital - Monona Velarde
Huancavelica - Violeta Ortega
Ica - Rosario Elías
Junín - Graciela Odriozola
La Libertad - Carmela Condemarin

Lambayeque - Maritza Newman
Loreto - Olga Herbozo
Madre de Dios - Cossi Zapata
Moquegua - Graciela 'Chela' Olazabal
Pasco - Maritza Pletikosich
Piura - María Elena Rossel
San Martín - Mery Checa
Tacna - Carmen Lavarello

References 

Miss Peru
1959 in Peru
1959 beauty pageants